Shanthi Nivasa is a 1988 Indian Kannada-language film, directed by H. R. Bhargava and produced by R. F. Manik Chand and A. S. Mohan. The film stars Anant Nag, Bharathi, Vijayakashi and Ramesh Bhat. The film has musical score by M. Ranga Rao.

Cast

Anant Nag
Bharathi
Vijay Kashi
Ramesh Bhat
Sundar Krishna Urs
Mysore Lokesh
K. S. Ashwath
Rajanand
Thimmayya
Lohithaswa
N. S. Rao
Dinesh
Phani Ramachandra
M. S. Karanth
Bemel Somanna
Janardhan
Chikkanna
Dinakar
Abhijith
Srishaila
Anand More
Siddalingappa
C. Neelakanta
Umashree
Kadambari
Sudha Narasimharaju
Shanthamma
Anu
Shilpa

Soundtrack
The music was composed by M. Ranga Rao.

References

External links
 

1988 films
1980s Kannada-language films
Films scored by M. Ranga Rao
Films directed by H. R. Bhargava